Genysa is a genus of East African armored trapdoor spiders that was first described by Eugène Louis Simon in 1889.  it contains only three species, all found in Madagascar: G. bicalcarata, G. decorsei, and G. decorsei.

See also
 List of Idiopidae species
 List of spiders of Madagascar

References

External links

Idiopidae
Mygalomorphae genera
Spiders of Madagascar